Platycheirus europaeus is a Palearctic species of hoverfly. It is found in many parts of Europe and eastern Asiatic Russia
The habitat is brook floodplains and wet flushes in montane grassland and beside streams or flushes in forest in the Carpinus and Quercus zone up into the Fagus and Picea/ Pinus zone. Flies among grasses from May to August. Flowers visited include Graminae and Cyperaceae, Ranunculus, Taraxacum.

References

External links
Images representing Platycheirus europaeus

Diptera of Europe
Syrphinae
Insects described in 1990